The Huang Brook or Huang Jian (Chinese: , lit. "August Stream") is a watercourse in Gansu, China, running into the Jianghe River.

It is mentioned in the Book of Songs as being crossed by Duke Liu on his way to a new homeland for the Ji clan. It is also the namesake of the huanhepterus pterosaur.

References

External links

Rivers of Gansu